Nettapakkam is a legislative assembly constituency in the Union territory of Puducherry in India.
 Nettapakkam assembly constituency was part of Puducherry (Lok Sabha constituency). This assembly constituency is reserved for SC candidates from 2011.

Segments
Maducarai
Nettapakkam
Kariyamanickam
Sooramangalam
Pandasozhanallur
Earipakkam

Members of Legislative Assembly

Election results

2021

See also
 List of constituencies of the Puducherry Legislative Assembly
 Puducherry district

References 

Assembly constituencies of Puducherry